

Events

January 

 January 1 – The Anglo-Egyptian Condominium ends in Sudan.
 January 8 – Operation Auca: Five U.S. evangelical Christian missionaries, Nate Saint, Roger Youderian, Ed McCully, Jim Elliot and Pete Fleming, are killed for trespassing by the Huaorani people of Ecuador, shortly after making contact with them.
 January 16 – Egyptian leader Gamal Abdel Nasser vows to reconquer Palestine.
 January 25–26 – Finnish troops reoccupy Porkkala, after Soviet troops vacate its military base. Civilians can return February 4.
 January 26 – The 1956 Winter Olympics open in Cortina d'Ampezzo, Italy.

February 

 February 11 – British spies Guy Burgess and Donald Maclean resurface in the Soviet Union, after being missing for 5 years.
 February 14–25 – The 20th Congress of the Communist Party of the Soviet Union is held in Moscow.
 February 16 – The 1956 World Figure Skating Championships open in Garmisch, West Germany.
 February 22 – Elvis Presley enters the United States music charts for the first time, with "Heartbreak Hotel".
 February 23 – Norma Jean Mortenson legally changes her name to Marilyn Monroe.
 February 24 – Doris Day records her most famous song, "Que Sera, Sera (Whatever Will Be, Will Be)"; it is from Alfred Hitchcock's The Man Who Knew Too Much, in which Day co-stars with James Stewart.
 February 25 – Nikita Khrushchev attacks the veneration of Joseph Stalin, in a speech "On the Cult of Personality and Its Consequences", at a secret session concluding the 20th Congress of the Communist Party of the Soviet Union. This is not officially made public in the Soviet Union at this time but becomes known in the West in June.

March 

 March 1 – The International Air Transport Association finalizes a draft of the radiotelephony spelling alphabet, for the International Civil Aviation Organization.
 March 2 – Morocco declares its independence from France.
 March 9
 The British deport Archbishop Makarios from Cyprus to the Seychelles.
 The Soviet Armed Forces suppress mass demonstrations in the Georgian Soviet Socialist Republic, reacting to Nikita Khrushchev's de-Stalinization policy.
 March 11 – After having opened in London the previous year, Laurence Olivier's film, Richard III, adapted from Shakespeare's play, has its U.S. premiere in theatres and on NBC-TV on the same day. On television it is not shown in prime time, but as an afternoon matinée, in a slightly cut version, one of the first such experiments. Olivier is later nominated for an Oscar for his performance.
 March 12 – 96 U.S. Congressmen sign the Southern Manifesto, a protest against the 1954 Supreme Court ruling (Brown v. Board of Education) that desegregated public education.
 March 13 – Elvis Presley releases his first gold album titled Elvis Presley in the United States.
 March 15 – The Broadway musical My Fair Lady opens in New York City.
 March 19 – At age 48, Dutch boxer Bep van Klaveren contests his last match in Rotterdam.
 March 20 – Tunisia gains independence from France.
 March 21 – The 28th Academy Awards Ceremony is held in Los Angeles. Marty is awarded Best Picture.
 March 23 – Pakistan becomes the first Islamic republic, and a national holiday is observed in the country, including the state of East Pakistan.

April 

 April 2 – The first episodes of As the World Turns and The Edge of Night are broadcast on the CBS Television Network in the United States.
 April 7 – Spain relinquishes its protectorate in Morocco.
 April 9 – Habib Bourguiba is elected President of the National Constituent Assembly of the Kingdom of Tunisia; on April 15 he becomes Prime Minister.
 April 14 – Videotape is first demonstrated at the 1956 NARTB (modern-day NAB) convention in Chicago by Ampex. It is the demonstration of the first practical and commercially successful videotape format known as 2" Quadruplex.
 April 17 – Queen Elizabeth II inaugurates the 4.9 km2 Chew Valley Lake in Somerset, England, as a reservoir for the Bristol area.
 April 18 – Maria Desylla-Kapodistria is elected mayor of Corfu, becoming the first female mayor in Greece.
 April 19
 British diver Lionel (Buster) Crabb (working for MI6) dives into Portsmouth Harbour, to investigate a visiting Soviet cruiser, and vanishes.
 American actress Grace Kelly marries Rainier III, Prince of Monaco.
 The 5.0  1956 Atarfe-Albolote earthquake strikes southern Spain killing 12 and injuring dozens more.
 April 21 – Former U.S. First Daughter Margaret Truman marries Clifton Daniel.
 April 27 – Heavyweight boxing champion Rocky Marciano retires, without losing a professional boxing match.

May 

 May 1 – Minamata disease is discovered in Japan.
 May 2
 The United Methodist Church in America decides, at its General Conference, to grant women full ordained clergy status. It also calls for an end to racial segregation in the denomination.
 Violet Gibson, who attempted to assassinate Mussolini in 1926, dies in a mental hospital in England, after a lifetime of imprisonment.
 May 8
 Austria and Israel establish diplomatic relations.
 The constitutional union between Indonesia and the Netherlands is dissolved.
 John Osborne's Look Back in Anger opens at the Royal Court Theatre, London, changing the scope of theatrical and other forms of drama in the UK: the theatre's press release describes the dramatist as among the angry young men of the time.
 May 9 – Manaslu, eighth highest mountain in the world (in the Nepalese Himalayas) is first ascended, by a Japanese team.
 May 18 – Lhotse main summit, the fourth highest mountain (on the Nepalese–Tibetan border) is first ascended, by Fritz Luchsinger and Ernst Reiss.
 May 22 – The NBC Peacock logo debuts on television in the United States.
 May 23 – French minister Pierre Mendès France resigns, due to his government's policy on Algeria.
 May 24 – The first Eurovision Song Contest is broadcast from Lugano, Switzerland. The winning song is the host country's Refrain by Lys Assia (music by Géo Voumard, lyrics by Émile Gardaz).
 May 25 – India announces the institution of diplomatic relations with Francoist Spain.

June 

 June 1 – Vyacheslav Molotov resigns as foreign minister of the Soviet Union; he later becomes ambassador to Mongolia.
 June 3 – British Railways rename 'Third Class' passenger facilities 'Second Class'.
 June 4 – Montgomery bus boycott: The related civil suit is heard in federal district court; the U.S. Supreme Court will uphold the ruling in November.
 June 5
 The text of Nikita Khrushchev's February attack on Stalin's reputation, "On the Cult of Personality and Its Consequences", is first published in the West, in The New York Times.
 Elvis Presley performs "Hound Dog" on The Milton Berle Show, scandalizing the American television audience with his suggestive hip movements.
 June 6 – In Singapore, chief minister David Marshall resigns, after the breakdown of talks about internal self-government in London.
 June 8 – General Electric/Telechron introduces model 7H241 "The Snooz Alarm", the first snooze alarm clock ever.
 June 10 – 1956 Summer Olympics: Equestrian events open in Stockholm, Sweden (all other events are held in November in Melbourne, Australia).
 June 13
 The International Criminal Police Organization adopts Interpol as its official name.
 Real Madrid beats Stade Reims 4–3 at Parc des Princes, Paris and wins the 1955–56 European Cup (football).
 June 14 – The Flag of the United States Army is formally dedicated.
 June 15 – Eindhoven University of Technology is founded in Eindhoven, The Netherlands.
 June 18 – The last British troops leave Egypt.
 June 21 – Playwright Arthur Miller appears before the House Un-American Activities Committee in Washington, D.C.
 June 23 – Gamal Abdel Nasser becomes the 2nd president of Egypt, a post he holds until his death in 1970.
 June 28
 Poznań 1956 protests: Labour riots in Poznań, Poland, are crushed with heavy loss of life. Soviet troops fire at a crowd protesting high prices, killing 53 people.
 The film version of Rodgers and Hammerstein's The King and I, starring Deborah Kerr and Yul Brynner, is released only a few months after the film version of R&H's Carousel. It becomes the most financially successful film version of a Rodgers and Hammerstein musical up to this time, and the only one to win an acting Oscar (Yul Brynner wins Best Actor for his performance as the King of Siam). It is also one of two Rodgers and Hammerstein films to be nominated for Best Picture (which it does not win).
 June 29
 Actress Marilyn Monroe marries playwright Arthur Miller, in White Plains, New York.
 President Dwight D. Eisenhower signs the Federal Aid Highway Act of 1956, creating the Interstate Highway System in the United States.
 June 30 – 1956 Grand Canyon mid-air collision: A TWA Lockheed Constellation and United Airlines Douglas DC-7 collide in mid-air over the Grand Canyon in Arizona, killing all 128 people aboard both aircraft, in the deadliest civil aviation disaster to date; the accident leads to sweeping changes in the regulation of cross-country flight and air traffic control over the United States.

July 

 July 2 – A laboratory experiment involving scrap thorium at Sylvania Electric Products in Bayside, New York, results in an explosion.
 July 4 – An American Lockheed U-2 reconnaissance aircraft makes its first flight over the Soviet Union.
 July 8 – The mountain Gasherbrum II, on the border of Pakistan and China, is first ascended, by an Austrian expedition.
 July 9 – The 7.7  Amorgos earthquake shakes the Cyclades island group in the Aegean Sea, with a maximum Mercalli intensity of IX (Violent). The shaking and the subsequent tsunami leave 53 people dead.
 July 10 – The British House of Lords defeats the abolition of the death penalty.
 July 13 – John McCarthy (Dartmouth), Marvin Minsky (MIT), Claude Shannon (Bell Labs) and Nathaniel Rochester (IBM) assemble the first coordinated research meeting on the topic of artificial intelligence, at Dartmouth College, Hanover, New Hampshire, in the United States.
 July 16 – With the closing of its "Big Tent" show in Pittsburgh, Ringling Bros. and Barnum & Bailey Circus announces all subsequent circuses will be "arena shows", due to changing economics.
 July 24 – At New York City's Copacabana nightclub, Dean Martin and Jerry Lewis perform their last comedy show together (their act started on July 25, 1946).
 July 26 – Egyptian leader Gamal Abdel Nasser nationalizes the Suez Canal, sparking international condemnation.
 July 30 – A joint resolution of Congress is signed by President Dwight D. Eisenhower, authorizing "In God we trust" as the U.S. national motto.
 July 31
 Cricket: Jim Laker sets an extraordinary record at Old Trafford in the fourth Test between England and Australia, taking 19 wickets in a first class match (the previous best was 17).
 Luzhniki Stadium, well known sports venue of Russia and the Soviet Union, officially opens in Moscow.

August 

 August 6 – After going bankrupt in 1955, the American broadcaster DuMont Television Network airs its final broadcast, an episode of its sports series Boxing from St. Nicholas Arena.
 August 7 – Seven ammunition trucks loaded with 1,053 boxes of dynamite explode in Cali, Colombia. Death estimates range from 1,300 to 10,000, in a city that at this time has 120,000 inhabitants.
 August 8 – 262 miners (chiefly Italian nationals) die in a fire at the Bois du Cazier coal mine, in Marcinelle, Belgium.
 August 9 – Art exhibition This Is Tomorrow opens at Whitechapel Art Gallery in London.
 August 12 – Around 5,000 members of the Romanian Greek-Catholic Church hold a mass outside Cluj-Napoca Piarists' Church to demonstrate that their church, proscribed by the government in 1948, has not ceased to exist as the regime claims.
 August 17 – West Germany bans the Communist Party of Germany.

September 

 September 9 – Elvis Presley appears on The Ed Sullivan Show in the United States for the first time.
 September 13
 The hard disk drive is invented by an IBM team, led by Reynold B. Johnson.
 The dike around the Dutch polder East Flevoland is closed.
 September 16 – Television broadcasting in Australia commences.
 September 21 – Nicaraguan dictator Anastasio Somoza García is assassinated.
 September 25 – The submarine transatlantic telephone cable opens.
 September 27 – The Bell X-2 becomes the first crewed aircraft to reach Mach 3.

October 

 October 5 – Cecil B. DeMille's epic film The Ten Commandments, starring Charlton Heston as Moses, is released in the United States. It will be in the top ten of the worldwide list of highest-grossing films of all time, adjusted for inflation.
 October 8 – Baseball pitcher Don Larsen of the New York Yankees throws the only perfect game in World Series history, in Game 5 of the 1956 World Series against the Brooklyn Dodgers. Yogi Berra catches the game. Dale Mitchell is the final out. The New York Yankees win the series in seven games. Larsen is named series MVP.
 October 10
 Finland joins UNESCO.
 The prototype Lockheed L-1649 Starliner, the final Lockheed Constellation model, makes its first flight.
 October 14 – In India:
 Indira Kala Sangeet University, Khairagarh, is inaugurated by Indira Gandhi.
 Dalit Buddhist movement: Dr. B. R. Ambedkar, Dalit leader, converts to Buddhism, along with 385,000 followers.
 October 15 – The British Royal Air Force retires its last Avro Lancaster bomber.
 October 17
 The world's first industrial-scale commercial nuclear power plant is opened at Calder Hall in England.
 The Game of the Century (chess): 13-year-old Bobby Fischer beats grandmaster Donald Byrne, in the Rosenwald Memorial Tournament in New York City.
 October 22 – Suez Crisis: The United Kingdom, France, and Israel secretly meet in Sèvres and make plans to invade Egypt.
 October 23 – The Hungarian Revolution breaks out against the pro-Soviet government, originating as a student demonstration in Budapest. Hungary attempts to leave the Warsaw Pact.
 October 26 – Soviet Red Army troops invade Hungary.
 October 29
 Suez Crisis: Israel invades the Sinai Peninsula and pushes Egyptian forces back toward the Suez Canal.
 Tangier Protocol: The international city Tangier is reintegrated into Morocco.
 The Huntley-Brinkley Report debuts on NBC-TV in the United States.
 October 31
 Suez Crisis: The United Kingdom and France begin bombing Egypt to force the reopening of the Suez Canal.
 A United States Navy team becomes the third group to reach the South Pole (arriving by air), and commences construction of the first permanent Amundsen–Scott South Pole Station.

November 
 November 1
 The States Reorganisation Act of India reforms the boundaries and names of Indian states. Three new states, Kerala, Karnataka and Andhra Pradesh, are formed.
 City Lights Bookstore in San Francisco publishes Howl and Other Poems by Allen Ginsberg, a key work of the Beat Generation.
 The film Oklahoma! (1955), previously released to select cities in Todd-AO, now receives a U.S. national release in CinemaScope, since not all theatres are yet equipped for Todd-AO. To accomplish this, the film has actually been shot twice, rather than printing one version in two different film processes, as is later done.
 November 3
 Khan Yunis massacre (Suez Crisis): Israeli soldiers shoot dead hundreds of Palestinian refugees and local inhabitants in Khan Yunis Camp.
 MGM's film The Wizard of Oz is the first major Hollywood film running more than 90 minutes to be televised uncut in one evening, in the United States.
 November 4 – Hungarian Revolution of 1956: More Soviet troops invade Hungary, to crush the revolt that started on October 23. Thousands are killed, more are wounded, and nearly a quarter million leave the country.
 November 6 – 1956 United States presidential election: Republican incumbent Dwight D. Eisenhower defeats Democratic challenger Adlai Stevenson, in a rematch of their contest 4 years earlier.
 November 7 – Suez Crisis: The United Nations General Assembly adopts a resolution calling for the United Kingdom, France and Israel to withdraw their troops from Arab lands immediately.
 November 11 – Hungarian Revolution of 1956: Last insurgents succumb to the invading Soviet army.
 November 12 – Morocco, Sudan and Tunisia join the United Nations.
 November 13 – Browder v. Gayle: The United States Supreme Court declares illegal the state and municipal laws requiring segregated buses in Montgomery, Alabama, thus ending the Montgomery bus boycott.
 November 14 – An eight-mile long stretch of highway is opened west of Topeka, Kansas, creating the first portion of the Interstate Highway System in the United States and the first highway to be completed with funds from the Federal Aid Highway Act of 1956.
 November 15 – Middle East Technical University is founded in Ankara, Turkey.
 November 18 – At a reception for Western ambassadors at the Polish embassy in Moscow, Nikita Khrushchev utters his famous phrase "We will bury you".
 November 20 – In Yugoslavia, former prime minister Milovan Đilas is arrested after he criticizes Josip Broz Tito.
 November 22 – The 1956 Summer Olympics begin in Melbourne, Australia.
 November 23 – The Suez Crisis causes petrol rationing in Britain.
 November 25 – Fidel Castro and Che Guevara depart from Tuxpan, Veracruz, Mexico, en route to Santiago de Cuba aboard the yacht Granma, with 82 men.
 November 28 – Roger Vadim's drama film And God Created Woman, released in France as Et Dieu ... créa la femme, propels Brigitte Bardot into the public spotlight as a "sex kitten".
 November 30 – African-American Floyd Patterson wins the world heavyweight boxing championship that is vacant after the retirement of Rocky Marciano.

December 
 December 2
 Fidel Castro and his followers land in Cuba, from the yacht Granma.
 A pipe bomb planted by George Metesky explodes at the Paramount Theater in Brooklyn, injuring 6 people.
 December 3 – The 1956 Bush Terminal explosion occurs in Brooklyn.
 December 4 – The Million Dollar Quartet (Elvis Presley, Jerry Lee Lewis, Carl Perkins, and Johnny Cash) get together at Sun Studio, for the first and last time in history.
 December 9 – Trans-Canada Air Lines Flight 810, a Canadair North Star, crashes into Slesse Mountain near Chilliwack, British Columbia. All 62 people aboard, including five Canadian Football League players, are killed.
 December 12 – Japan becomes a member of the United Nations.
 December 18 – To Tell the Truth debuts on CBS-TV in the United States.
 December 19 – British doctor John Bodkin Adams is arrested for the murder of 2 patients in Eastbourne, England; he will be acquitted.
 December 23 – British and French troops leave the Suez Canal region.
 December 31 – Bob Barker makes his television debut, as host of the game show Truth or Consequences in the United States.

Date unknown 
 Asian flu pandemic originates in China.
 The Alpine Club of Canada, Toronto section, is founded.

Births

January 

 January 1
 Mark R. Hughes, American entrepreneur (d. 2000)
 Kōji Yakusho, Japanese actor
 Christine Lagarde, French lawyer and politician, IMF Managing Director and ECB president
 Dzulkefly Ahmad, Malaysian politician
 Andrew Lesnie, Australian cinematographer (d. 2015)
 Andy Gill, English musician (Gang of Four) (d. 2020)
 January 3
 Mel Gibson, American actor and director
 Tomiko Suzuki, Japanese voice actress (d. 2003)
 January 4 – Bernard Sumner, British musician
 January 5
 Ana Pessoa Pinto, East Timorese politician and jurist
 Celso Blues Boy, Brazilian singer and guitarist (d. 2012)
 Chen Kenichi, Japan-born Chinese chef
 Frank-Walter Steinmeier, German politician
 January 7
 David Caruso, American actor
 Uwe Ochsenknecht, German actor
 Johnny Owen, Welsh boxer (d. 1980)
 Miladin Šobić, Montenegrin singer
 January 9
 Kimberly Beck, American actress
 Imelda Staunton, English actress
 January 12 – Nikolai Noskov, Soviet and Russian rock singer and songwriter
 January 13 – Janet Hubert, African-American actress
 January 14 – Ronan Bennett, Northern Irish writer
 January 15 – Vitaly Kaloyev, Russian convicted murderer, architect deputy minister of construction of North Ossetia-Alania
 January 16 – Martin Jol, Dutch football manager
 January 17 – Paul Young, English musician
 January 18
 Tom Bailey, English musician
 Sharon Mitchell, American sexologist
 Jim Mothersbaugh, American rock drummer
 January 19 – Adriana Acosta, Argentine militant and field hockey player (d. 1978)
 January 20 – Bill Maher, American actor, comedian and political analyst
 January 21
 Robby Benson, American actor, voice actor, director, singer and educator
 Geena Davis, American actress
 January 24 – Lounès Matoub, Algerian Berber Kabyle singer (d. 1998)
 January 25 – Bronwyn Pike, Australian politician
 January 26 – Pat Musick, American voice actress
 January 27
 Susanne Blakeslee, American actress
 Mimi Rogers, American actress
 January 28 – Peter Schilling, German singer
 January 29
 Jan Jakub Kolski, Polish film director
 Irlene Mandrell, American musician, actress
 January 30 – Keiichi Tsuchiya, Japanese race car driver
 January 31
 John Lydon, British punk musician and TV personality
 Trevor Manuel, South African politician

February 

 February 1 – Mike Kitchen, Canadian ice hockey player and coach
 February 2
 Philip Franks, English actor and director
 Alireza Soleimani, Iranian heavyweight freestyle wrestler (d. 2014)
 February 3
 Nathan Lane, American actor
 Lee Ranaldo, American musician
 February 6 – Jon Walmsley, British actor
 February 7
 John Posey, American actor and writer
 Heather Jones, Australian writer
 Mark St. John, American guitarist (d. 2007)
 February 10 – Enele Sopoaga, 12th Prime Minister of Tuvalu
 February 11
 Didier Lockwood, French jazz violinist (d. 2018)
 Catherine Hickland, American actress
 February 13
 Peter Hook, British bass player
 Yiannis Kouros, Greek-Australian ultra marathoner
 Jay Nixon, 55th Governor of Missouri
 Paul Stojanovich, American television producer
 February 14 – Tom Burlinson, Australian actor
 February 15 – Desmond Haynes, West Indian cricketer
 February 18
 Ted Gärdestad, Swedish singer, songwriter and musician (d. 1997)
 Thomas Gradin, Swedish hockey player
 February 19
 Kathleen Beller, American actress
 Roderick MacKinnon, American biologist, recipient of the Nobel Prize in Chemistry
 Dave Wakeling, English musician
 February 20 – François Bréda, Romanian essayist, poet, literary critic, literary historian, translator and theatrologist (d. 2018)
 February 23
 Reinhold Beckmann, German television presenter
 Paul O'Neill, American composer, record producer (d. 2017)
 February 24
 Judith Butler, American philosopher
 Paula Zahn, American television journalist
 February 25
 Davie Cooper, Scottish footballer (d. 1995)
 Michel Friedman, German lawyer, politician and talk show host
 February 26
 Michel Houellebecq, French author
 Keisuke Kuwata, Japanese musician
 February 27
Angela Aames, American actress (d. 1988)
 Tim Brando, American sports broadcaster
 February 28
 Liem Swie King, Indonesian badminton player
 Thomas Remengesau Jr., 7th and 9th President of Palau
 February 29
 Mike Compton, American mandolinist
 Bob Speller, Canadian politician
 Aileen Wuornos, American serial killer (d. 2002)

March 

 March 1
 Tim Daly, American actor and producer
 Dalia Grybauskaitė, President of Lithuania
 March 2 – Eduardo Rodríguez, President of Bolivia
 March 3 – Frank Giroud, French comics writer (d. 2018)
 March 5
 Teena Marie, American singer (d. 2010)
 Marco Paolini, Italian stage actor, dramaturge and author
 March 7
 Andrea Levy, English novelist (d. 2019)
 Bryan Cranston, American actor, director, producer and screenwriter
 March 8 – John Kapelos, Canadian actor
 March 9
 Kadyrzhan Batyrov, Kyrgyz businessman and politician (d. 2018)
 Shashi Tharoor, Indian politician
 March 11 – Rob Paulsen, American voice actor and singer
 March 12
 Lídice da Mata, Brazilian politician
 Pim Verbeek, Dutch football manager and former player (d. 2019)
 March 13 – Dana Delany, American actress
 March 16
 Boaz Arad, Israeli visual artist (d. 2018)
 Vladimír Godár, Slovak composer
 March 17 – Frank McGarvey, Scottish professional footballer (d. 2023)
 March 18 – Ingemar Stenmark, Swedish alpine skier
 March 19 – Yegor Gaidar, Russian economist and politician (d. 2009)
 March 20
 Minken Fosheim, Norwegian actress and author (d. 2018)
 Catherine Ashton, British politician
 Sabiamad Abdul Ahad, Malaysian sport shooter (d. 2021)
 Naoto Takenaka, Japanese actor, comedian, singer and director
 José Manuel Barroso, Prime Minister of Portugal
 Ingrid Kristiansen, Norwegian runner
 Win Lyovarin, Thai author
 March 22
 Tyrone Brunson, American singer (d. 2013)
 Ilana Kloss, South-African born tennis player, tennis coach, and commissioner of World Team Tennis
 Maria Teresa, Grand Duchess of Luxembourg, consort of Grand Duke Henri
 March 24 – Steve Ballmer, American businessman, CEO of Microsoft (2000–2014), owner of the Los Angeles Clippers
 March 25 – Matthew Garber, English child actor (d. 1977)
 March 28
 Susan Ershler, American mountaineer
 Evelin Jahl, German athlete
 March 29 – Evie, American Christian musician
 March 30 – Shahla Sherkat, Iranian feminist journalist

April 

 April 3
 Ray Combs, American game show host and comedian (d. 1996)
 Miguel Bosé, Panamanian-born musician and actor
 Boris Miljković, Serbian TV & theatre director and video artist
 April 4
 Kerry Chikarovski, Australian politician
 David E. Kelley, American writer and television producer
 April 5
 Diamond Dallas Page, American professional wrestler
 El Risitas, Spanish comedian and actor (d. 2021)
 April 6
 Michele Bachmann, American politician
 Sebastian Spreng, American-Argentinean visual artist
 Dilip Vengsarkar, Indian cricketer
 April 7 – Christopher Darden, African-American attorney, author, actor and lecturer
 April 9 – Edmund Chong Ket Wah, Malaysian politician (d. 2010)
 April 12
 Andy García, Cuban-American actor
 Herbert Grönemeyer, German musician and actor
 Yasuo Tanaka, Japanese politician, novelist
 April 13 – Possum Bourne, New Zealand rally car driver (d. 2003)
 April 14 – Barbara Bonney, American soprano
 April 16
 David M. Brown, American astronaut (d. 2003)
 Lise-Marie Morerod, Swiss skier
 April 18
 John James, American actor
 Melody Thomas Scott, American actress
 Karim Abdul Razak, Ghanaian footballer
 Eric Roberts, American actor
 April 19 – Sue Barker, British tennis player and television presenter
 April 21 – Phillip Longman, American demographer
 April 22 – Jukka-Pekka Saraste, Finnish conductor
 April 23 – Greg Colson, American artist
 April 26 – Koo Stark, British actress
 April 27 – Bryan Harvey, American musician (d. 2006)
 April 28
 Jimmy Barnes, Scottish-Australian singer and songwriter
 Hanka Paldum, Bosnian singer
 April 30 – Lars von Trier, Danish film director and screenwriter

May 

 May 1
 Alexander Ivanov, Russian-born American chess grandmaster
 Danilo De Girolamo, Italian voice actor (d. 2012)
 May 4
 David Guterson, American writer
 Ulrike Meyfarth, German high jumper
 May 5 – Lisa Eilbacher, American actress
 May 6
 Vladimir Lisin, Russian business oligarch
 Cindy Lovell, American educator and writer
 May 7
 S. Scott Bullock, American actor and voice actor
 Jan Peter Balkenende, Prime Minister of the Netherlands (2002–2010)
 Jean Lapierre, Canadian politician and television host (d. 2016)
 May 9
 Cesare Alpini, Italian art historian
 Frank Andersson, Swedish wrestler (d. 2018)
 Wendy Crewson, Canadian actress
 May 10
 Vladislav Listyev, Russian journalist (d. 1995)
 Paige O'Hara, American actress, voice actress, singer and painter
 Bikenibeu Paeniu, 2-Time Prime Minister of Tuvalu
 May 12
 Jānis Bojārs, Latvian shot putter (d. 2018)
 Asad Rauf, Pakistani cricket player and umpire (d. 2022)
 May 13
 Kenneth Eriksson, Swedish rally driver
 Sri Sri Ravi Shankar, Indian guru
 Mirek Topolánek, 7th Prime Minister of the Czech Republic
 Kirk Thornton, American voice actor
 May 15 – Dan Patrick, American sports commentator
 May 17
 Cheenu Mohan, Indian actor (d. 2018)
 Sugar Ray Leonard, American boxer, motivational speaker and actor
 May 19 – Steven Ford, American actor
 May 20
 Ingvar Ambjørnsen, Norwegian author
 Dean Butler, American actor and producer
 May 23
 Ursula Plassnik, Austrian politician
 Buck Showalter, American baseball player and manager
 May 24
 Michael Jackson, Irish Anglican bishop
 Sean Kelly, Irish road cyclist
 May 26 – Lisa Niemi, American actress and dancer
 May 27 – Giuseppe Tornatore, Italian film director
 May 28
 Jerry Douglas, American dobro player
 John O'Donoghue, Irish Fianna Fáil politician
 Sayuri Yamauchi, Japanese voice actress (d. 2012)
 John Wells, American television producer and writer
 May 29 – La Toya Jackson, American singer, songwriter, actress, businesswoman and television personality
 May 30 – David Sassoli, 16th President of the European Parliament (d. 2022)
 May 31 – Yoshiko Sakakibara, Japanese voice actress

June 

 June 1
 Chintaman Vanaga, Indian politician (d. 2018)
 Peter Tomka, Judge, International Court of Justice
 Amanda Miguel, Argentinian singer
 June 2 – Mani Ratnam, Indian film director, screenwriter and producer
 June 3 – George Burley, Scottish football manager
 June 4 – Keith David, African-American actor and voice actor
 June 5 – Kenny G, American saxophonist
 June 6
 Yuri Shundrov, Russian-Ukrainian ice hockey goaltender (d. 2018)
 Christopher Adamson, British actor
 Björn Borg, Swedish tennis player
 June 7
 Paul Sherwen, English racing cyclist and broadcaster (d. 2018)
 Antonio M. Reid, American record executive
 June 8
 Péter Besenyei, Hungarian pilot
 Udo Bullmann, German politician
 Jonathan Potter, British psychologist
John Petrizzelli, Venezuelan film director
 June 9 – Patricia Cornwell, American novelist
 June 10 – Borwin, Duke of Mecklenburg, German head of the House of Mecklenburg
 June 11
 Ashwini Kumar Chopra, Indian journalist, cricketer and politician (d. 2020)
 Joe Montana, American football player
 Arthur Porter, Canadian physician (d. 2015)
 June 13 – Yurik Vardanyan, Soviet weightlifter (d. 2018)
 June 14 – King Diamond, Danish heavy metal musician
 June 15 – Robin Curtis, American actress
 June 17 – Kelly Curtis, American actor
 June 20 – Cho Chikun, Korean Go player
 June 21 – Thomas James O'Leary, American actor
 June 22
 Abdulbaset Sieda, Kurdish-Syrian academic and politician
 François Hadji-Lazaro, French actor and musician
 Tim Russ, American actor, film director, screenwriter and musician
 June 23
 Randy Jackson, African-American musician and talent judge
 Mai Yamani, Saudi Arabian independent scholar, author and anthropologist
 June 24 – Turid Leirvoll, Norwegian-Danish politician
 June 25
 Madeleine Petrovic, Austrian politician
 Isabel de Navarre, German figure skating coach
 Boris Trajkovski, President of the Republic of Macedonia (d. 2004)
 Anthony Bourdain, American chef, writer and television personality (d. 2018)
 Chloe Webb, American actress and singer
 Bob West, American voice actor and graphic designer
 June 26
 Catherine Samba-Panza, President of the Central African Republic
 Chris Isaak, American musician
 Davide Ferrario, Italian film director, screenwriter and author
 June 27
 Sultan bin Salman Al Saud, Royal Saudi Air Force pilot
 Heiner Dopp, German field hockey player
 June 28 – Noel Mugavin, Australian rules football player
 June 29
 Nick Fry, British motorsport
 Honorato Hernández, Spanish long-distance runner
 Richard Summerbell, Canadian mycologist, author and songwriter
 June 30
 Sun Chanthol, Cambodian politician
 Jessi Lintl, Austrian politician
 David Alan Grier, African-American actor, comedian (In Living Color)
 Piero Aiello, Italian politician

July 

 July 1
 Alan Ruck, American actor
 Gregg L. Semenza, American cellular biologist, recipient of the Nobel Prize in Physiology or Medicine
 July 2
 Jerry Hall, American model and actress
 Cynthia Kadohata, Japanese-American children's writer
 July 3
Dorota Pomykała, Polish actress
Min Aung Hlaing, Burmese Army General
 July 4 – Bárbara Bruno, Brazilian actress, director and producer
 July 5
 Sapawi Ahmad, Malaysian politician
 Horacio Cartes, former President of Paraguay
 Louis Herthum, American actor and producer
 Sheila Walsh, Scottish Christian artist and talk-show hostess
 July 7
 Janet Cruz, American politician
 Mullah Krekar, Iraqi Kurdish scholar and militant
 Ryuho Okawa, Japanese religious leader (d. 2023)
 Giam Swiegers, South African-Australian business executive
 July 9 – Tom Hanks, American actor and director
 July 10 – K. Rajagopal, Malaysian football manager and national player
 July 11
 Amitav Ghosh, Indian-American fiction writer
 Sela Ward, American actress
 July 12 – Mel Harris, American actress
 July 13
 Günther Jauch, German television host
 Koffi Olomide, Congolese soukous singer, dancer, producer and composer
 Michael Spinks, African-American boxer
 July 14
 Dragan Despot, Croatian actor
 Vladimir Kulich, Czechoslovakian actor
 July 15
 Ian Curtis, English rock musician (Joy Division) (d. 1980)
 Barry Melrose, Canadian hockey player, coach and commentator
 Steve Mortimer, Australian rugby league player
 Toshihiko Seko, Japanese long-distance runner
 July 16
 Jerry Doyle, American talk show host and actor (d. 2016)
 Tony Kushner, American playwright
 Pratibha Singh, Indian politician
 July 17 – Robert Romanus, American actor and musician
 July 18 – Sheila Aldridge, American singer
 July 19
 Peter Barton, American actor
 Yoshiaki Yatsu, Japanese professional wrestler
 July 20 – Thomas N'Kono, Cameroonian footballer
 July 24
 Charlie Crist, American politician, 44th Governor of Florida
 Pat Finn, American game show host and producer
 Carmen Nebel, German television presenter
 July 25 – Frances Arnold, American biochemist, recipient of the Nobel Prize in Chemistry
 July 26
 Andy Goldsworthy, British sculptor and photographer
 Dorothy Hamill, American figure skater, Olympic gold medalist
 July 30
 Delta Burke, American actress
 Anita Hill, African-American lawyer and academic
 July 31
 Michael Biehn, American actor
 Deval Patrick, American politician, first African-American Governor of Massachusetts
 Laura Zapata, Mexican television actress

August 

 August 2 – Robert Khuzami, Deputy Attorney for the Southern District of New York
 August 4
 Gerry Cooney, American boxer
 Randall Wright, Canadian economist
 August 5
 Ferdi Bolland, Dutch musician, songwriter and music producer (Bolland & Bolland)
 Maureen McCormick, American actress
 August 6 – Stepfanie Kramer, American actress
 August 7
 Ernie Johnson, Jr., American sportscaster
 Christiana Figueres, Costa Rican diplomat and environmentalist
 August 8 – Chris Foreman, English rock guitarist
 August 10
 Dianne Fromholtz, Australian tennis player
 Fred Ottman, American professional wrestler
 Charlie Peacock, American Christian producer, singer-songwriter
 August 12 – Bruce Greenwood, Canadian actor
 August 14
 Jackée Harry, American actress and television personality
 Rusty Wallace, American NASCAR race car driver
 August 17 – Dave Jones, English football manager
 August 18 – John Debney, American film composer
 August 19 – Adam Arkin, American actor
 August 20
 Joan Allen, American actress
 Jan Henry T. Olsen, Norwegian politician (d. 2018)
 August 21
 Kim Cattrall, English-born Canadian actress
 David Clarke, African-American law enforcement official
 August 22
 Leah Cherniak, Canadian playwright and theatre director
Sid Michaels Kavulich, American politician and sportscaster (d. 2018)
 Paul Molitor, American baseball player
 August 23
 Andreas Floer, German mathematician (d. 1991)
 Cris Morena, Argentine actress and television producer
 August 24
 John Culberson, American politician
 Kevin Dunn, American actor
 August 25 – Henri Toivonen, Finnish rally car driver (d. 1986)
 August 26 – Mark Mangino, American football coach
 August 28
Luis Guzmán, Puerto Rican actor
Pamela Eells O'Connell, American television producer and writer
 August 29
 GG Allin, American punk singer (d. 1993)
 Mark Morris, American choreographer
 August 31
 Masashi Tashiro, Japanese television performer
 Tsai Ing-wen, President of the Republic of China (Taiwan)

September 

 September 1 – Bernie Wagenblast, American editor and broadcaster
 September 2
 Nandamuri Harikrishna, Indian actor and politician (d. 2018)
 Angelo Fusco, Provisional Irish Republican Army member
 September 3 – Pat McGeown, Provisional Irish Republican Army member (d. 1996)
 September 5 - Low Thia Khiang,  Singaporean politician
 September 6 – Bill Ritter, American politician, 41st Governor of Colorado
 September 7 – Michael Feinstein, American singer and pianist
 September 8 – Maurice Cheeks, American basketball player and coach
 September 11 – Phillip D. Bissett, American politician
 September 12
 Leslie Cheung, Hong Kong actor (d. 2003)
 Ricky Rudd, American race car driver
 Walter Woon, law professor, Nominated Member of Parliament and Attorney-General of Singapore
 September 13 – Ilie Balaci, Romanian football player (d. 2018)
 September 14
 Kostas Karamanlis, Greek politician
 Ray Wilkins, English footballer and coach (d. 2018)
 September 15 – George Howard, American jazz saxophone musician (d. 1998)
 September 16
 Sergei Beloglazov, Russian free-style wrestler
 David Copperfield, American illusionist
 Ross Greenberg, American journalist and antivirus pioneer (d. 2017)
 Kazuharu Sonoda, Japanese professional wrestler (d. 1987)
 September 17
 Brian Andreas, American writer, sculptor, painter and publisher
 Almazbek Atambayev, 3-Time Prime Minister of Kyrgyzstan and 4th President of Kyrgyzstan
Susie Silvey, English actress, dancer and model
 September 18 – Tim McInnerny, English actor
 September 20
 Gary Cole, American television, film and voice actor
 Debbi Morgan, African-American actress
 September 21 – Jack Givens, American basketball player
 September 23
 Mait Riisman, Estonian water polo player (d. 2018)
 Peter David, comic book writer and novelist
 Paolo Rossi, Italian soccer player (d. 2020)
 September 24 – Greg Panos, American futurist, writer, inventor
 September 25 – Jamie Hyneman, American television co-host
 September 26 – Linda Hamilton, American actress
 September 29 – Sebastian Coe, Baron Coe, British athlete; co-ordinator of the London 2012 Olympic Games
 September 30 – Gordon Elliott, British-Australian television personality and talk show host

October 

 October 1
 Tara Buckman, American actress
 Andrus Ansip, Estonian politician, 10th Prime Minister of Estonia
 Theresa May, Prime Minister of the United Kingdom
 October 2 – Charlie Adler, American voice actor and director
 October 3 – Ralph Morgenstern, German actor
 October 4 – Christoph Waltz, German-Austrian actor
 October 8
 Danny Jacob, American composer, songwriter and guitarist
 Stephanie Zimbalist, American actress
 October 10 – Amanda Burton, Irish actress
 October 11 – Nicanor Duarte, 47th President of Paraguay
 October 12 – Trần Đại Quang, President of Vietnam (d. 2018)
 October 16 – Rudra Mohammad Shahidullah, Bangladeshi poet (d. 1991)
 October 17
 Mae Jemison, African-American astronaut
 Stephen Palumbi, American academic and author
 Ken Morrow, American ice hockey player
 October 18
 Craig Bartlett, American animator, writer, storyboard artist, director and voice actor
 Martina Navratilova, Czech-American multiple Grand Slam title winning tennis player
 October 19
 Sunny Deol, Indian actor, director, producer and politician
 Carlo Urbani, Italian physician (d. 2003)
 October 20
 Shafie Apdal, Malaysian politician
 Danny Boyle, English film director
 October 21 – Carrie Fisher, American actress and novelist (d. 2016)
 October 22 – Marvin Bush, American businessman
 October 23
 Darrell Pace, American archer
 Dwight Yoakam, American country singer, musician and actor
 October 26 – Rita Wilson, American actress and producer
 October 28 – Mahmoud Ahmadinejad, 6th President of Iran
 October 29 – Wilfredo Gómez, Puerto Rican boxer

November 

 November 4 – Igor Talkov, Russian singer-songwriter and actor (d. 1991)
 November 5 – Rob Fisher, British keyboardist and songwriter (Climie Fisher) (d. 1999)
 November 7
 Mikhail Alperin, Soviet-Norwegian jazz pianist (d. 2018)
 Judy Tenuta, American comedian and musician (d. 2022)
 November 8
 Richard Curtis, English film director, producer and screenwriter
 Kurt Sorensen, New Zealand rugby league player
 November 10
 Margarita Robles, Spanish politician and judge
 Sinbad, African-American stand-up, comedian and actor
 November 11 – Talat Aziz, ghazal singer
 November 13 – Charlie Baker, American politician, 72nd Governor of Massachusetts
 November 14
 Avi Cohen, Israeli football player (d. 2010)
 Greg Pence, American businessman and politician
 Peter R. de Vries, crime reporter (d. 2021)
 November 15 – Zlatko Kranjčar, Croatian football player and coach (d. 2021)
 November 16 – Terry Labonte, American Race Car Driver
 November 17
 Angelika Machinek, German glider pilot (d. 2006)
 Kelly Ward, American actor
 November 18
 Noel Brotherston, Irish footballer (d. 1995)
 Warren Moon, American football player
 November 19 – Ann Curry, American journalist
 November 20
 Jan Maxwell, American actress (d. 2018)
 Bo Derek, American actress and model
 Olli Dittrich, German actor, comedian, television personality and musician
 November 21 – Terri Welles, American actress and adult model
 November 22 – Richard Kind, American actor
 November 23
 Cal Dodd, Irish-Canadian voice actor and singer
 Shane Gould, Australian Olympic triple gold medallist swimmer (1972)
 Nikolay Sidorov, Soviet athlete
 November 24 – Jouni Kaipainen, Finnish composer
 November 26 – Dale Jarrett, American Race Car Driver
 November 27
 Nazrin Shah of Perak, 35th Sultan of Perak
 William Fichtner, American actor
 November 28
 Kristine Arnold, American singer (Sweethearts of the Rodeo)
 Lucy Gutteridge, English actress
 November 29
 Eric Laakso, American football player
 Leo Laporte, American author and television host
 Bill Baker, American ice hockey player

December 

 December 1
 Sultan bin Zayed bin Sultan Al Nahyan, Emirati politician and royal (d. 2019)
 Markos Kounalakis, American journalist, author and scholar, Second Gentleman of California
 December 4 – Bernard King, American basketball player and commentator
 December 5
 Klaus Allofs, German football player
 Krystian Zimerman, Polish pianist
 December 6
 Peter Buck, American guitarist
 Randy Rhoads, American guitarist (d. 1982)
 December 7
 Chuy Bravo, Mexican-American actor and entertainer (d. 2019)
 Larry Bird, American basketball player
 Iveta Radičová, Prime Minister of Slovakia
 December 9
 Antony Alda, American actor (d. 2009)
 Jean-Pierre Thiollet, French writer
 Baruch Goldstein, American-Israeli physician and mass murderer (d. 1994)
 December 10 – Rod Blagojevich, American politician and convicted felon, Governor of Illinois (2003–2009)
 December 11 – Lani Brockman, American playwright
 December 12
 Ana Alicia, Mexican actress
 Johan van der Velde, Dutch cyclist
 December 13 – Majida El Roumi, Lebanese singer
 December 14 – Béla Réthy, German sports journalist
 December 16 – Duncan Faure, South African musician
 December 18 – Ron White, American comedian
 December 19
 Masami Akita, Japanese noise musician (also known as Merzbow)
 Jimmy Cauty, British musician (The KLF, The Timelords)
 December 21 – Anna Erlandsson, Swedish filmmaker and animator
 December 23
 Michele Alboreto, Italian race car driver (d. 2001)
 Dave Murray, British musician (Iron Maiden)
 December 24
 Anil Kapoor, Indian actor
 Shim Hwa-jin, South Korean academic
 December 26
 Michael Jones (aka Kashif), musician, singer-songwriter (B.T. Express) (d. 2016)
 David Sedaris, American essayist
 December 28
 Nigel Kennedy, English violinist
 Jimmy Nicholl, Canadian-born footballer
 Phil Verchota, American ice hockey player
 December 29 – Fred MacAulay, Scottish comedian
 December 30
 Patricia Kalember, American actress
 Sheryl Lee Ralph, African American-actress
 December 31
 Shelagh Rogers, Canadian radio host
 Hussein Ahmed Salah, Djiboutian marathon runner

Date unknown 
 Dong Hao, Chinese host, voice actor and painter
 Gilma Jiménez, Colombian politician (d. 2013)
 Nancy Lynn, American aerobatic pilot (d. 2006)
 Ephraim Mirvis, South African-born Chief Rabbi of the United Hebrew Congregations of Great Britain and the Commonwealth
 Mirtha Rivero, Venezuelan journalist and writer.
 Susan Solomon, American atmospheric chemist
 Chris Wilson, Australian musician (d. 2019)

Deaths

January 

 January 3
 Alexander Gretchaninov, Russian composer (b. 1864)
 Joseph Wirth, Chancellor of Germany (b. 1879)
 January 5 – Mistinguett, French singer and actress (b. 1875)
 January 9 – Marion Leonard, American actress (b. 1881)
 January 10
Zonia Baber, American geographer and geologist (b. 1862)
Karl Ludwig Schmidt, German theologian (b. 1891)
 January 12
 Norman Kerry, American actor (b. 1894)
 Sam Langford, Canadian boxer (b. 1883)
 January 13 – Lyonel Feininger, German painter (b. 1871)
 January 14 – Sheila Kaye-Smith, English writer (b. 1887)
 January 18 – Konstantin Päts, 1st President of Estonia (b. 1874)
 January 23 – Sir Alexander Korda, Hungarian-born film director (b. 1893)
 January 27 – Erich Kleiber, German conductor (b. 1890)
 January 29 – H. L. Mencken, American writer (b. 1880)
 January 31 – A. A. Milne, English author (Winnie The Pooh) (b. 1882)

February 

 February 2
 Bob Burns, American comedian (b. 1890)
 Charley Grapewin, American actor (b. 1869)
 February 3 – Robert Yerkes, American psychologist and ethologist (b. 1876)
 February 8 – Connie Mack, American baseball executive and manager (Philadelphia Athletics) and a member of the MLB Hall of Fame (b. 1862)
 February 10 – Hugh Trenchard, 1st Viscount Trenchard, British marshal of the Royal Air Force (b. 1873)
 February 13 – Jan Łukasiewicz, Polish logician and philosopher (b. 1878)
 February 14 – Sir Walter Cowan, British admiral (b. 1871)
 February 18 – Gustave Charpentier, French composer (b. 1860)
 February 20
 Heinrich Barkhausen, German physicist (b. 1881)
 James Cousins, Irish writer (b. 1873)
 February 26 – Elsie Janis, American singer and actress (b. 1889)
 February 28 – Frigyes Riesz, Hungarian mathematician (b. 1880)
 February 29 – Elpidio Quirino, 6th President of the Philippines (b. 1890)

March 

 March 9 – Arthur Leopold Busch, English-born American submarine pioneer (b. 1866)
 March 12
 Bolesław Bierut, Polish Communist politician and statesman, former Prime Minister and President of Poland (b. 1892)
 Suzanne Tassier-Charlier, Belgian historian (b. 1898)
 March 14 – David Browning, American Olympic diver (b. 1931)
 March 17
 Fred Allen, American comedian (b. 1894)
 Irène Joliot-Curie, French physicist, recipient of the Nobel Prize in Chemistry (b. 1897)
 March 18
 Louis Bromfield, American writer (b. 1896)
 Paul Masson-Oursel, French orientalist and philosopher (b. 1882)
 March 20
 Fanny Durack, Australian swimmer (b. 1889)
 Wilhelm Miklas, 3rd President of Austria (b. 1872)
 March 21 – Edwin Thanhouser, American actor, businessman, and film producer, founder of the Thanhouser Company (b. 1865)
 March 22
 Eduardo Lonardi, Argentine military officer, (de facto) 30th President of Argentina (b. 1896)
 George Sarton, Belgian-American chemist and historian (b. 1884)
 March 25
 Lou Moore, American racing driver and team owner (b. 1904)
 Robert Newton, English film actor (b. 1905)
 March 28 – Thomas de Hartmann, Russian composer (b. 1885)
 March 30 – Edmund Clerihew Bentley, English writer (b. 1875)
 March 31 – Ralph DePalma, Italian-born American race car driver (b. 1884)

April 

 April 6 – Pío Valenzuela, Filipino physician and one of the leaders of the Katipunan (b. 1869)
 April 13 – Emil Nolde, German-Danish painter (b. 1867)
 April 15 – Kathleen Howard, Canadian-born American actress and opera singer (b. 1884)
 April 19 – Ernst Robert Curtius, Alsatian philologist (b. 1886)
 April 21
 Samuel Gottesman, American pulp-paper merchant (b. 1885)
 Charles MacArthur, American playwright and screenwriter (b. 1895)
 April 24 – Henry Stephenson, British character actor (b. 1871)
 April 26 – Edward Arnold, American actor (b. 1890)
 June 28 – Friedrich Schmidt-Ott, German lawyer, scientific organizer, and science policymaker (b. 1860)
 April 29
 Harold Bride, English-born junior radio officer on RMS Titanic (b. 1890)
 Wilhelm Ritter von Leeb, German field marshal (b. 1876)
 April 30 – Alben W. Barkley, 35th Vice President of the United States (b. 1877)

May 
 May 3
 Rodney Collin, British writer (b. 1909)
 Peter Watson, English art collector and benefactor (b. 1908)
 May 6 – Fergus Anderson, British motorcycle racer (b. 1909)
 May 12 – Louis Calhern, American actor (b. 1895)
 May 15 – Austin Osman Spare, English artist and occultist (b. 1886)
 May 18 – Maurice Tate, English cricketer (b. 1895)
 May 20
 Max Beerbohm, English essayist, parodist and caricaturist (b. 1872)
 Zoltán Halmay, Hungarian Olympic swimmer (b. 1881)
 May 23 – Gustav Suits, Estonian poet (b. 1883)
 May 24
Guy Kibbee, American actor (b. 1882)
Martha Annie Whiteley, English chemist and mathematician (b. 1866)
 May 26 – Al Simmons, American baseball player (Philadelphia Athletics) and a member of the MLB Hall of Fame (b. 1902)
 May 29 – Frank Beaurepaire, Australian Olympic swimmer (b. 1891)
 May 30 - George Murray Levick, British Antarctic explorer and naval surgeon (b. 1876)
 May 31 – Diedrich Hermann Westermann, German linguist (b. 1875)

June 

 June 2 – Jean Hersholt, Danish-born American actor (b. 1886)
 June 4 – Katherine MacDonald, American silent film actress (b. 1891)
 June 6
 Hiram Bingham III, American explorer, discoverer of Machu Picchu (b. 1875)
 Margaret Wycherly, English stage and film actress (b. 1881)
 June 7 – Julien Benda, French philosopher and novelist (b. 1867)
 June 9 – Chandrashekhar Agashe, Indian industrialist (b. 1888)
 June 11
 Frank Brangwyn, Anglo-Welsh artist (b. 1867)
 Ralph Morgan, American actor (b. 1883)
 June 17
 Paul Rostock, German official, surgeon, and university professor (b. 1892)
 Artur Văitoianu, Romanian general and politician, 27th Prime Minister of Romania (b. 1864)
 June 19 – Thomas J. Watson, American computer pioneer (b. 1874)
 June 22 – Walter de la Mare, English poet, short story writer, and novelist (b. 1873)
 June 23 – Reinhold Glière, Russian composer (b. 1875)
 June 25
Ernest King, American Navy Fleet Admiral and Commander in Chief, United States Fleet (COMINCH) and Chief of Naval Operations (CNO) during World War II (b. 1878)
 Michio Miyagi, Japanese musician (b. 1894)
 June 26 – Clifford Brown, American jazz trumpeter (b. 1930)
 June 28 – Claud Schuster, 1st Baron Schuster, British civil servant (b. 1869)

July 
 July 1 – Tawfik Abu Al-Huda, 4-Time Prime Minister of Jordan (b. 1894)
 July 7 – Gottfried Benn, German poet (b. 1886)
 July 8 – Giovanni Papini, Italian essayist, poet, novelist (b. 1881)
 July 10 – Joe Giard, American baseball player (b. 1898)
 July 11 – John T. Raulston, American Scopes Monkey Trial judge (b. 1868)
 July 12 – Sprague Cleghorn, Canadian ice hockey player (b. 1890)
 July 20 – James Alexander Calder, Canadian politician (b. 1868)
 July 24 – Géza Zemplén, Hungarian chemist (b. 1883)
 July 29 – Ludwig Klages, German philosopher and psychologist (b. 1872)

August 

 August 2 – Albert Woolson, last surviving Union veteran of the American Civil War (b. 1847)
 August 6 – Ioan Popovici, Romanian general (b. 1857)
 August 9 – Archie Cameron, Australian politician (b. 1895)
 August 11
 Jackson Pollock, American painter (b. 1912)
 Mincho Neychev, former Chairman of the Presidium of the National Assembly (head of state) of Bulgaria (b. 1887)
 August 14
 Bertolt Brecht, German playwright (b. 1898)
 Konstantin von Neurath, Nazi German diplomat and foreign minister (b. 1873)
 August 16
 Bela Lugosi, Hungarian-born American film actor (Dracula) (b. 1882)
 Lynde D. McCormick, American admiral (b. 1895)
 August 19 – Bernard Griffin, English Cardinal, Catholic Archbishop of Westminster (b. 1899)
 August 23 – Peaches Browning, American actress (b. 1910)
 August 24 – Kenji Mizoguchi, Japanese film director (b. 1898)
 August 25 – Alfred Kinsey, American sex researcher (b. 1894)

September 

 September 6
 Lee Jung-seob, Korean oil painter (b. 1872)
 Felix Borowski, British-American composer and teacher (b. 1872)
 September 7 – C. B. Fry, English sportsman and writer (b. 1872)
 September 11
 Billy Bishop, Canadian World War I flying ace (b. 1894)
 Lucien Febvre, French historian (b. 1878)
 September 20 – Flora Eldershaw, Australian novelist, critic, and historian (b. 1897)
 September 22 – Frederick Soddy, English chemist, Nobel Prize laureate (b. 1877)
 September 27
 Milburn G. Apt, American test pilot (b. 1924)
 Babe Didrikson Zaharias, American golfer (b. 1911)
 September 28 – William E. Boeing, American engineer and airplane manufacturer (b. 1881)
 September 29 – Anastasio Somoza García, President of Nicaragua (assassinated) (b. 1896)

October 

 October 1 – Albert Von Tilzer, American songwriter (b. 1878)
 October 2 – George Bancroft, American actor (b. 1882)
 October 6 – Charles E. Merrill, American banker, co-founder of Merrill Lynch (b. 1885)
 October 9 – Marie Doro, American stage & silent film actress (b. 1882)
 October 12 – Lorenzo Perosi, Italian composer (b. 1872)
 October 14 – Jules Richard, French mathematician (b. 1862)
 October 16
 Jules Rimet, French football administrator, 3rd president of FIFA (b. 1873)
 Jack Southworth, English footballer (b. 1866)
 October 17 – Anne Crawford, British actress (b. 1920)
 October 19 – Isham Jones, American musician (b. 1894)
 October 22 – Hannah Mitchell, English socialist and suffragette (b. 1872)
 October 25 – Risto Ryti, 23rd Prime Minister of Finland and 5th President of Finland (b. 1889)
 October 26 – Walter Gieseking, French conductor (b. 1895)
 October 27 – Charles S. Johnson, American sociologist (b. 1893)
 October 30 – Pío Baroja, Spanish novelist (b. 1872)

November 

 November 1
 Pietro Badoglio, Italian field marshal and 28th Prime Minister of Italy (b. 1871)
 Tommy Johnson, American musician (b. 1896)
 November 2 – Leo Baeck, German rabbi, scholar and theologian (b. 1873)
 November 3 – Jean Metzinger, French painter, theorist and critic (b. 1883)
 November 5 – Art Tatum, American jazz pianist (b. 1909)
 November 6 – Paul Kelly, American stage and film actor (b. 1899)
 November 10
 Harry Ford Sinclair, American entrepreneur (b. 1876)
 Victor Young, American composer (b. 1900)
 November 12 – Juan Negrín, 67th Prime Minister of Spain (b. 1892)
 November 13 – Werner Haas, German motorcycle racer (b. 1927)
 November 19 – Francis L. Sullivan, English actor (b. 1903)
 November 22 – Theodore Kosloff, Russian-born ballet dancer, choreographer and actor (b. 1882)
 November 23 – André Marty, French Communist Party leader (b. 1886)
 November 24
 Guido Cantelli, Italian conductor (b. 1920)
 Sir Lionel Whitby, British haematologist and academic administrator (b. 1895)
 November 26 – Tommy Dorsey, American trombonist and bandleader (b. 1905)
 November 27 – Hugo Ballin, American artist, film production designer, and director (b. 1879)

December 

 December 2 – Dell Henderson, Canadian actor (b. 1877)
 December 3 – Alexander Rodchenko, Russian artist (b. 1891)
 December 6 – B. R. Ambedkar, Indian jurist and politician (b. 1891)
 December 7
 Henry Fillmore, American composer and bandleader (b. 1881)
 Huntley Gordon, Canadian actor (b. 1887)
 December 9 – Charles Joughin, English-born baker on RMS Titanic (b. 1878)
 December 10 – David Shimoni, Israeli poet and writer (b. 1891)
 December 12 – Ewald André Dupont, German film director (b. 1891)
 December 14 – Juho Kusti Paasikivi, twice Prime Minister of Finland and 7th President of Finland (b. 1870)
 December 16
 René Couzinet, French aeronautics engineer and aircraft manufacturer (suicide) (b. 1904)
 Nina Hamnett, Welsh artist (b. 1890)
 December 17
 Eddie Acuff, American actor (b. 1903)
 Whitford Kane, Irish-born American actor (b. 1881)
 December 21 – Lewis Terman, American psychologist (b. 1877)
 December 23 – Josep Puig i Cadafalch, Spanish architect (b. 1867)
 December 25 – William Addison Dwiggins, American book designer, type designer, illustrator, author, marionette artist (b. 1880)
 December 26 – Holmes Herbert, English actor (b. 1882)
 December 30 – Ruth Draper, American actress (b. 1884)

Date unknown 
 Dumitru Coroamă, Romanian soldier and fascist activist (b. 1885)
Victoria Hayward, Bermudan-born travel writer and journalist (b. 1876)
 Lotte Herrlich, female photographer of German naturism (b. 1883)

Nobel Prizes 

 Physics – William Shockley, John Bardeen, Walter Houser Brattain
 Chemistry – Sir Cyril Norman Hinshelwood, Nikolay Semyonov
 Physiology or Medicine – André Frédéric Cournand, Werner Forssmann, Dickinson W. Richards
 Literature – Juan Ramón Jiménez
 Peace – Not Awarded

References

Bibliography

Further reading 
 London Institute of World Affairs, The Year Book of World Affairs 1957 (London 1957) full text online, comprehensive reference book covering 1956 in diplomacy, international affairs and politics for major nations and regions

External links 
 1956 in History

 
Leap years in the Gregorian calendar